Antonio Manrique Valencia (1519 – 19 December 1577) was a Roman Catholic prelate who served as Bishop of Pamplona (1575–1577).

Biography
Antonio Manrique Valencia was born in 1519 in Zamora, Spain. On 28 February 1575, he was appointed during the papacy of Pope Gregory XIII as Bishop of Pamplona. On 26 June 1575, he was consecrated bishop by Juan Quiñones Guzman, Bishop of Calahorra y La Calzada, with Pedro del Frago Garcés, Bishop of Jaca, and Alfonso Merchante de Valeria, Titular Bishop of Sidon, serving as co-consecrators. He served as Bishop of Pamplona until his death on 19 December 1577.

References 

16th-century Roman Catholic bishops in Spain
Bishops appointed by Pope Gregory XIII
1519 births
1577 deaths